On the Boulevard is the sixth studio album by the progressive bluegrass band New Grass Revival, released in 1984. It is the first of four studio albums from the group's last lineup.

Track listing
 "On The Boulevard" (Pat Flynn) - 4:10
 "Earth, Water, Wind, and Fire" (Bob Lucas) - 3:46
 "You're The Best Friend That I've Known" (R. Cook, P. Donnelly) - 2:58
 "Just Is" (John Cowan) - 2:25
 "County Clare" (Béla Fleck) - 4:08
 "One More Love Song" (Leon Russell) - 3:19
 "You Don't Knock" (W. Westbrook/C.a. Walton) - 2:33
 "One Of These Trains" (Pat Flynn, D. Rommereim) - 3:48
 "Get In The Wind" (G. Place) - 3:01
 "Indian Hills" (Sam Bush) - 5:37
 "One Love/People Get Ready" (Bob Marley, C. Mayfield) - 3:51
 "Where Do I Go From Here" (L. Carroll) - 5:52
 "Walkin' In Jerusalem" (Traditional) - 3:05

Personnel
Sam Bush – guitar, mandolin, fiddle, vocals
Pat Flynn – guitar, vocals
Béla Fleck – banjo, vocals
John Cowan – vocals, bass

Additional musicians:
Eddie Bayers – drums
Bob Mater – drums
Tom Roady – percussion

Production notes
Garth Fundis – producer
Denny Purcell – mastering
Bil VornDick – engineer
Caroline Greyshock – photography
Henry Marquez – art direction

References

1987 albums
New Grass Revival albums
Albums produced by Garth Fundis
Capitol Records albums